The 1926 season was the fifteenth season for Santos FC.

References

External links
Official Site 

Santos
1926
1926 in Brazilian football